The 2020 SMU Mustangs football team represented Southern Methodist University during the 2020 NCAA Division I FBS football season. The Mustangs were led by third-year coach Sonny Dykes and played their home games at Gerald J. Ford Stadium in University Park, Texas, a separate city within the city limits of Dallas, competed as members of the American Athletic Conference.

After finishing their regular season with a record of 7–3 (4–3 in conference play), the Mustangs accepted an invitation to the Frisco Bowl, where they were slated to play the UTSA Roadrunners. However, the bowl was subsequently canceled, due to COVID-19 concerns within the SMU football program.

Previous season
The Mustangs finished the 2019 season 10–3, 6–2 in The American play to finish in third place in the West Division. The Mustangs competed in the postseason bowl season, ultimately losing to FAU in the Boca Raton Bowl 28–52.

Preseason

Media poll
The preseason Poll was released September 1

Recruiting class
References:

|}

Schedule

Rankings

Personnel

Depth chart

Game summaries

at Texas State

at North Texas

Stephen F. Austin

Memphis

at Tulane

Cincinnati

Navy

at Temple

at Tulsa

at East Carolina

Houston

Players drafted into the NFL

References

SMU
SMU Mustangs football seasons
SMU Mustangs football